Several ships of the Swedish Navy have borne the name Najaden, including:
 , a corvette launched in 1834 and decommissioned in 1874
 , a three-masted, wooden hulled sailing ship launched in 1897 as a training ship and decommissioned in 1938, now preserved as a museum ship

See also
 
 

Swedish Navy ship names